"Black Hole" is a song by British singer-songwriter Griff, from her mixtape One Foot in Front of the Other. The song is written by Griff, Peter Rycroft, and Frederik Castenschiold Eichen and produced by Lostboy. The song was released on 18 January 2021 on the Warner Records label.

Background and production
After a string of releases in 2020 from "Good Stuff" to "Love Is a Compass" which provided Griff with her first UK chart entry, "Black Hole" serves as Griff's first and only release in 2021 thus far. Being penned by Griff herself, when talking about the song with media company "The Forty-Five" Griff stated “Some people might listen to it and think, ‘Oh, these lyrics are quite deep, but I think I was trying to make them so melodramatic that there’s humor about them, It’s finding the humor in your own heartbreak. There’s obviously not a big black hole where my heart used to be.”

Critical reception and performance 
Rachael Jansky of "Ones to Watch" stated "Griff personifies the emptiness of losing someone, relating it to an all-consuming black hole. While a bit melodramatic, it perfectly captures just how overwhelming it can be to process a break-up and put yourself back together. The song's production is flooded with a bouncy synth and punchy drum beat, a darker twist on Griff's typical bright poppy sound. Showcasing her versatility and lyrical maturity, "Black Hole" alludes to Griff's inevitable stardom." Robin Murray of "CLASH" wrote a few words about the track stating "The songwriter opened January with a bang, landing a prime spot in the BBC Sound Of 2021 poll. New single 'Black Hole' builds on this, and it might well be Griff's finest moment to date."

To Date "Black Hole" is Griff's best performing song on the charts marking her first Irish chart entry and highest-peaking UK single peaking at 25 on the Irish Singles Chart and number 18 on the UK Singles Chart as well as 5 on the UK Top 100 Singles Downloads Chart. Griff performed the song on “Late Night With Seth Meyers” which served as the first televised live performance of the song on March 22, 2021. The performance was later posted to Griff’s YouTube channel on May 19. She also performed the song for the second time on live television on May 11, at the 2021 Brit Awards, where she was nominated for and won the Brit Award for Rising Star.

Personnel 
Credits adapted from YouTube Music.
 Sarah Faith Griffiths – vocals, songwriting
 Jez Coad – production, Keyboards, Bass Programmer, Drum Programmer
 Frederik Castenschiold Eichen – songwriting
 Peter Rycroft – songwriting
 Dan Grech-Marguerat – mixing
 Chris Gehringer – mastering

Charts

Certifications

Release history

References

2021 singles
2021 songs
Griff (singer) songs
Songs written by Griff (singer)
Warner Records singles
Songs written by Peter Rycroft